Ars or ARS may refer to:

Places
 Ars, Iran, a village in East Azerbaijan Province, Iran
 Ars, various communes in France:
 Ars, Charente, in the Charente département
 Ars, Creuse, in the Creuse département
 Ars-en-Ré, in the Charente-Maritime département
 Ars-Laquenexy, in the Moselle département
 Ars-les-Favets, in the Puy-de-Dôme département
 Ars-sur-Formans, in the Ain département
 Ars-sur-Moselle, in the Moselle département

Art and entertainment
 Ars (film), France, 1959
 Ars Technica, a news website sometimes referred to as Ars
 Ars (magazine), a cultural magazine in Montenegro
 African red slip ware, a type of Roman pottery 
 Atlanta Rhythm Section, an American rock band
 Automatic Reaction System (ARS) in the film Virus (1980)

Computing and technology
 Abstraction, reference and synthesis, the principles of ARS-based programming
 Active Roll Stabilization
 Airline Reservations System
 ARS, the United States Navy hull code for "rescue and salvage ship"
 ARS (rocket family), American Interplanetary Society, 1930s
 ARS++, a programming language that demonstrates ARS-based programming
 Audience Response System
 Automatic Route Selection (telephony)
 Automatic Route Setting of the IECC railway signalling system

Organizations
 Agricultural Research Service
 Alliance for the Re-liberation of Somalia
 American Residential Services, also known as ARS/Rescue Rooter
 American Rhododendron Society
 American Rocket Society
 American Rose Society
 Americans for Responsible Solutions, a gun control advocacy organization
 Ann Richards School for Young Women Leaders
 Archives of the Republic of Slovenia
 Armenian Relief Society
 Assemblea Regionale Siciliana, Sicilian Regional Assembly

Science 
 Abstract rewriting system in mathematical logic
 Acoustic resonance spectroscopy
 Acute radiation syndrome, from radiation poisoning
 ADHD rating scale
 Al-Raqad syndrome
 Autonomously replicating sequence, in yeast DNA

Sport
 Sjoerd Ars (b .1984) a Dutch footballer
 ARS (bodyboard)
 American Racing Series

Other uses
 alt.religion.scientology, a discussion board for Scientology critics
 Arizona Revised Statutes
 Ars (slang), Israeli derogatory slang for a young man
 Argentine peso (ISO 4217 currency code: ARS)
 Auction rate security

See also
 Arse (disambiguation)